Sharipovo (Şärip) is a rural locality (a village) in Kelteyevsky Selsoviet, Kaltasinsky District, Bashkortostan, Russia. The population was 26 as of 2010. There are two streets.

Geography 
Sharipovo is located 88 km southwest of Kaltasy (the district's administrative centre) by road. Grafskoye is the nearest rural locality.

References 

Rural localities in Kaltasinsky District